Herbert Sydney Wregg (3 May 1879 – 14 September 1939) was an Australian rules footballer who played for Melbourne in the Victorian Football League (VFL).

Wregg was a full-forward at Melbourne in the 1901 VFL season but only made three appearances.

In 1904 he returned to the league as a boundary and field umpire. For the Grand Final that year, Wregg officiated as a boundary umpire, the first time the premiership decider had used one. He was then a field umpire in the 1906 VFL Grand Final.

References

Holmesby, Russell and Main, Jim (2007). The Encyclopedia of AFL Footballers. 7th ed. Melbourne: Bas Publishing.

1879 births
Melbourne Football Club players
Australian Football League umpires
1939 deaths
Australian rules footballers from Victoria (Australia)